Gurban Safarov (born 5 September 2004) is an Azerbaijani footballer who plays as a midfielder for Shamakhi in the Azerbaijan Premier League.

Club career
On 27 November 2021, Safarov made his debut in the Azerbaijan Premier League for Shamakhi match against Sabah.

References

External links
 

2004 births
Living people
Association football midfielders
Azerbaijan youth international footballers
Azerbaijani footballers
Azerbaijan Premier League players
Shamakhi FK players